Terry Buffalo Ware is an American guitarist and composer.

Early life 
Ware grew up in the Northwest Oklahoma town of Woodward. He attended the University of Oklahoma and graduated in 1972 with a degree in journalism professional writing.

He studied piano for 10 years beginning at age 9. He began playing guitar at age 14, and is self-taught. He also played the trombone in his high school band, and was in the Pride of Oklahoma, the University of Oklahoma's marching band, for one year. While still in high school, Ware played guitar in The Debtor Group, which performed regularly throughout Northwest Oklahoma and the Texas panhandle. The band Sailor which Ware formed in college was a local fixture in Oklahoma music scene of the early 1970s.

Career 
After graduating college, Ware moved to New Mexico, where he met Ray Wylie Hubbard. He and Hubbard formed Ray Wylie Hubbard and the Cowboy Twinkies, a group which still enjoys cult status. Hubbard and the Cowboy Twinkies performed all over the country from 1973 to 1979, including a stint at the Troubadour in Los Angeles and tours with Willie Nelson.
 
When the Cowboy Twinkies disbanded, Ware formed The Sensational Shoes in Norman, Oklahoma. This group enjoyed great regional popularity through the mid-1980s. Ware also released his debut album Caffeine Dreams in 1981.

Ware rejoined Hubbard in 1986, and the duo performed all over the United States and overseas. Ware's guitar work on Hubbard's Lost Train of Thought (1992) was critically acclaimed, as was his work on the 1994 release Loco Gringo's Lament and 1997's Dangerous Spirits. Ware performed with Jimmy LaFave from 1997-2000, giving many notable performances such as the July 31, 1999, Central Park Summerstage in New York.

In 1999, Ware was named a Texas Tornado by Buddy Magazine. The Buddy Texas Tornados are "an elite corp of the Lone Star State's finest musicians."

Since 2000, Ware has been a freelance guitarist backing artists including Ray Wylie Hubbard, John Fullbright, Joel Rafael, Michael Fracasso, Eliza Gilkyson, Smokey & the Mirror, Bob Livingston, Audrey Auld, Susan Herndon, Wanda Jackson, Don Conoscenti, Monica Taylor, Mary Reynolds, Red Dirt Rangers, Sam Baker, Greg Jacobs, Ellis Paul, Camille Harp, Iain Matthews, Sandy Rogers, and many others.

In 2003, Ware and the legendary singer-songwriter Bob Childers recorded Two Buffalos Walking-Live at The Blue Door. With John Fullbright, he performed on the 2013 Grammy pre-telecast, and on the David Letterman show in August 2014.

Ware has also released ten CDs on his own label OkieMotion Records, Buffalo Tracks (2001), Ridin' the Reverb Range (2004), Reverb Confidential (2007), Reverb Babylon (2011), Everybody's Got One with Gregg Standridge (2015),  Man With Guitar and Amp (2016), Aren't You a Little Old for This? (2018), Into The Dwell (2019), Isolation Reverberation (2020), and Covered Tracks (2021). In December 2011, Reverb Babylon was named one of the Top Ten Best Albums of 2011 by the San Antonio Express-News.

Ware has performed at every Woody Guthrie Folk Festival since it began in 1998, and has led the house band and served as master of ceremonies for the Hoot for Huntington's since 2003. Among the artists he has backed or performed with at the festival are David Amram, Ronny Elliot, Joel Rafael, The Burns Sisters, Rob McNurlin, Emma's Revolution, Kris Delmhorst, Nancy Apple and many others.

Discography 
Into The Dwell, 2019
Aren't You a Little Old for This?, 2018
Man With Guitar and Amp, 2016
 Everybody's Got One, Terry Buffalo Ware and Gregg Standridge, 2015
 Reverb Babylon, 2011
 Reverb Confidential, 2007
 Ridin' the Reverb Range, 2004
 Two Buffalos Walking - Live at The Blue Door, Bob Childers and Terry Buffalo Ware, 2003
 Buffalo Tracks, 2001
 Caffeine Dreams, 1981

Appears on the following recordings:

 Ray Wylie Hubbard & The Cowboy Twinkies, 1975
 Off the Wall, Ray Wylie Hubbard, 1978
 The Clovis Roblaine Story, Clovis Roblaine, 1979
 Oklahoma Bossa Nova, Steve Weichert, 1979
 Lost Train of Thought, Ray Wylie Hubbard, 1992
 Loco Gringo's Lament, Ray Wylie Hubbard, 1994
 Dangerous Spirits, Ray Wylie Hubbard, 1997
 Miles from Here, Macon Greyson, 1999
 Gecko Canyon, The Banded Geckos, 2000
 Staring Down the Sun, Red Dirt Rangers, 2002
 Land of a Thousand Surf Guitars, The Plungers, 2002
 Guitars Gone Wild, The Plungers, 2003
 Evil Fuzz, Davie Allan Tribute, 2004
 Restless Spirits: A Tribute to the Songs of Bob Childers, various artists, 2004
 Bitter Sweet, Dante, 2005
 The Stone Soup Sessions, John Egenes, 2011
 The Wind and the Weeds, Wendy Allyn, 2011
 Lucky Live, Greg Jacobs, 2011
 From the Ground Up, John Fullbright, 2012
 Songs, John Fullbright, 2014
 Vagabonde, Susan Herndon, 2015
 Thin Black Line, Smokey & the Mirror, 2015

Produced the following recordings:

 Don't Let Go, T.Z. Wright, 2015
 Old Habits Die Hard, Shawna LaRee, 2015
 End of Summer, Heartbreak Rodeo, 2018

References 

 Savage, William W. Singing Cowboys and All That Jazz: A Short History of Popular Music in Oklahoma, University of Oklahoma Press, 1983, pp. 165–168.
 Sellars, Tony. The Mysterious Musician, Oklahoma Music, Spring 2003, pp. 51–52.

External links 
 

Year of birth missing (living people)
Living people
People from Woodward, Oklahoma
American male composers
21st-century American composers
Guitarists from Oklahoma
American male guitarists
21st-century American male musicians
People from Norman, Oklahoma